Uraecha guerryi is a species of beetle in the family Cerambycidae. It was described by Maurice Pic in 1903, originally under the genus Eryssamena. It is known from China.

References

Lamiini
Beetles described in 1903